Gaganchandra Dam (1845–1910), mostly known as Gagan Harkara, was a Bengali Baul poet after the tune of whose famous song "Ami Kothay Pabo Tare" (কোথায় পাবো তারে) Rabindranath Tagore composed "Amar Shonar Bangla", the national anthem of Bangladesh.

In 1975 Bangladeshi pundit Ashraf Al Minar claimed that Rabindranath Tagore copied Gagan Harkara's works.

Early life and background
He resided at Kasba village in Kumarkhali Upazila in Kushtia in present-day Bangladesh. As he was a postman at Shelaidaha Post Office in Kumarkhali, people used to address him as "Harkara"; in Bengali, "Harkara" stands for "postman". He was used to delivering and collecting letters from Rabindranath Tagore during his (Tagore's) days in Shelaidaha. Tagore wrote over him many times in his letters, accumulated in Chinnapatra to Indira Devi.

It was Tagore who first published Harkara's song in his Prabashi Patra (a magazine) in 1322 BS. Tagore's niece Sarala Devi Chaudhurani published also an essay entitled "Lalon Fakir and Gagan" in Bharati, a mouthpiece of the Tagore family. This essay included two songs of Gagan – "Ami Kothai Pabo Tare" and "(O Mon) Asar Mayai Vule Robe". Rabindranath Tagore collected the songs of Gagan in 1889.

Legacy

Rabindranath Tagore referred to Gagan and his songs in his article: An Indian Folk Religion, songs and speeches. Rabindranath Tagore wrote a short story too (The Postmaster) partly after his life. Based upon the story, Satyajit Ray made his film: The Postmaster.

Tagore mentioned the following about Gagan:

References

Bengali musicians
Bengali male poets
Performers of Hindu music
Year of birth uncertain
National anthem writers
1845 births
1910 deaths